The Devil Is a Part-Timer! is a 2013 Japanese anime series based on the light novels of the same name written by Satoshi Wagahara. A second season was announced at Kadokawa's Light Novel Expo on March 6, 2021, with the main cast reprising their roles. The second season, titled The Devil Is a Part-Timer!!, is animated by 3Hz, with Daisuke Chikushi directing, Ydai Iino designing the characters, Yoshihiro Takeda serving as chief animation director and the rest of the staff returning from the first season. The second season premiered between July 14 and September 29, 2022, on Tokyo MX and BS11.


Episode list

Notes

References

2022 Japanese television seasons
The Devil Is a Part-Timer! episode lists